Sarah Siegelaar (born 4 October 1981 in Amsterdam) is a rower from the Netherlands.

Siegelaar took part in the World Championships of 2003 in Milan winning the silver medal in the four. With the Dutch eights she qualified for the 2004 Summer Olympics in Athens and she and her team mates rowed to the bronze medal. In 2007, she returned to the eights in which the Dutch only became seventh at the World Championships. Earlier that year they won the Rowing World Cup in Amsterdam and they finished third in both Luzern and Linz.

She qualified for the 2008 Summer Olympics in Beijing with the Dutch eights forming a team with Femke Dekker, Annemiek de Haan, Roline Repelaer van Driel, Nienke Kingma, Annemarieke van Rumpt, Marlies Smulders, Helen Tanger and cox Ester Workel.

References

1981 births
Living people
Dutch female rowers
Olympic bronze medalists for the Netherlands
Olympic medalists in rowing
Olympic rowers of the Netherlands
Olympic silver medalists for the Netherlands
Rowers from Amsterdam
Rowers at the 2004 Summer Olympics
Rowers at the 2008 Summer Olympics
Medalists at the 2008 Summer Olympics
Medalists at the 2004 Summer Olympics
20th-century Dutch women
20th-century Dutch people
21st-century Dutch women